Orbexilum, commonly called leather-root, is a genus of flowering plants in the legume family (Fabaceae). They are native to North America, where they are found in the United States and Mexico, south to Chiapas.

This genus can be distinguished from other genera in the Psoraleeae by its "thick glabrous pod walls that are distinctively rugose and by [a] calyx that is scarcely accrescent."

Taxonomy
The genus was described by Constantine Samuel Rafinesque in 1832, with the type species O. latifolia, moved from Psoralea. (O. latifolia is now considered a synonym of O. onobrychis.) Rafinesque differentiated Orbexilum from Psoralea largely on the basis of features of the calyx.

Species
Orbexilum comprises the following species:
 Orbexilum chiapasanum B.L.Turner
 Orbexilum lupinellus (Michx.) Isely
 †Orbexilum macrophyllum (Rowlee) Rydb. – bigleaf scurfpea
 Orbexilum melanocarpum (Benth.) Rydb.
 Orbexilum oliganthum (Brandegee) B.L.Turner
 Orbexilum onobrychis (Nutt.) Rydb.
 Orbexilum pedunculatum (Mill.) Rydb.
 Orbexilum psoralioides (Walter) Vincent, syn. Orbexilum gracile (Torr. & A.Gray) B.L.Turner
 Orbexilum simplex (Nutt. ex Torr. & A.Gray) Rydb.
 †Orbexilum stipulatum (Torr. & A.Gray) Rydb.
 Orbexilum virgatum (Nutt.) Rydb.

Notes

References

External links
USDA Plants Profile

 
Fabaceae genera